NorOntair, stylized as norOntair, was a Canadian regional airline operating in northern Ontario from October 18, 1971 to March 29, 1996. It was as a subsidiary of the Ontario Northland Transportation Commission (ONTC), a provincial Crown agency of the Government of Ontario, with the stated goal of creating east-west links across northern Ontario.

History

ONTC's first foray into air services began when it subcontracted flying operations to various airlines including Bradley Air Service (First Air), Austin Airways, Air-Dale Ltd and OnAir (taken over by Bearskin Airlines). Air-Dale Ltd. based in Sault Ste Marie was the airline's main operations base. Two de Havilland Dash 8-102 aircraft and six Dash 6-300 Twin Otters were based in Sault Ste Marie. Two additional Twin Otters were based in Thunder Bay and were operated by Bearskin Airlines crews but painted in full NorOntair colours. In its final years, ONTC bought Air-Dale Ltd and operated all the remaining routes until the service was discontinued.

In 1996, the newly elected government of Premier Mike Harris moved to close down the airline by removing subsidies. However, this had a negative effect on the region's economy over the next several years.

NorOntair was the first airline in the world to order and take delivery of Bombardier's de Havilland Canada Dash 8 Series 100, on October 23, 1984, operated by Air-Dale Ltd. The first Dash 8 in commercial service anywhere in the world wore NorOntair colours and was registered C-GJCB. It was number 6 from the assembly line and remained in active service until the closure of the company flying up to 14 hours a day across Northern Ontario.

Service area
The locations served included:

Dash 8 service:
 Fort Frances
 Kapuskasing
 North Bay
 Sault Ste. Marie
 Sudbury
 Thunder Bay
 Timmins
 Winnipeg
 Hearst

Twin Otter service:
 Atikokan
 Chapleau
 Earlton
 Elliot Lake
 Geraldton
 Gore Bay
 Hearst
 Hornepayne
 Kenora
 Kirkland Lake
 Pickle Lake
 Red Lake
 Sioux Lookout
 Terrace Bay
 Wawa

Incidents and accidents 
A second Dash 8 joined the fleet shortly after the first and was registered C-GPYD. It was seriously damaged on approach into Sault Ste Marie on February 2, 1986. The aircraft suffered a hard landing during a cockpit crew training flight. This caused the aircraft's landing gear to collapse, causing significant damage to the newly acquired plane. Of particular concern to the airline and to de Havilland Canada at the time was the fact that the crash caused one of the engine's propeller blades to violently break away from the engine housing. The blades penetrated the cabin wall of the aircraft, travelled through Row 2 of the aircraft interior and exited through the other side of the cabin sidewall on the opposite side. Since the aircraft was on a training flight, no passengers were on board. The flight crew escaped the aircraft without injury. The aircraft was removed from service and, after months of structural repairs and refurbishment, was returned to active service.

See also 
 List of defunct airlines of Canada

References

External links

Airtimes Website with NorOntair entry

Defunct airlines of Canada
Airlines established in 1971
Airlines disestablished in 1996
Ontario Northland Transportation Commission
Companies based in North Bay, Ontario
Canadian companies established in 1971
1971 establishments in Ontario
1996 disestablishments in Ontario
Government-owned airlines